Song festival can refer to a number of song contests or festivals:

Eurovision Song Contest, annual music competition
Sanremo Music Festival
Baltic song festivals:
Estonian Song Festival
Latvian Song and Dance Festival
Lithuanian Song Festival